Theodore Metochites (1270–1332) was a Byzantine Greek statesman, author, gentleman philosopher, and patron of the arts. From c. 1305 to 1328 he held the position of personal adviser (mesazōn) to emperor Andronikos II Palaiologos.

Life 
Metochites was born in Constantinople as the son of the archdeacon George Metochites, a fervent supporter of the union of the Orthodox and Catholic Churches. After the Council of Blachernae in 1285, his father was condemned and exiled, and Metochites seems to have spent his adolescence in the monastic milieux of Bithynia in Asia Minor. He devoted himself to studies of both secular and religious authors. When Andronicus II visited Nicaea in 1290/91, Metochites made such an impression on him that he was immediately called to the court and made Logothete of the Herds. Little more than a year later, he was appointed a Senator. Besides carrying out his political duties (embassies to Cilicia in 1295 and to Serbia in 1299), Metochites continued to study and to write. In 1312/13, he started learning astronomy from Manuel Bryennios; later he himself became the teacher of Nicephorus Gregoras. He was married with five sons and one daughter, Irene (spouse of John Komnenos Palaiologos).

Metochites' political career culminated in 1321, when he was invested as Grand Logothete. He was then at the summit of his power, and also one of the richest men of his age. Some of the money was spent on restoring and decorating the church of the Chora monastery in the northwest of Constantinople, where Metochites' donor portrait can still be seen in a famous mosaic in the narthex, above the entrance to the nave.

Metochites' fortunes were, however, linked with his emperor's. After a few years of intermittent civil war, Andronicus II was overthrown in 1328 by his own grandson, Andronicus III Palaeologus. Metochites went down with him. He was deprived of his possessions and forced into exile in Didymoteichon. In 1330, he was allowed to return to Constantinople. He then withdrew to Chora, where he died on 13 March 1332, having adopted the monastic name Theoleptos.

Works 
Metochites' extant œuvre comprises 20 Poems in dactylic hexameter, 18 orations (Logoi), Commentaries on Aristotle's writings on natural philosophy, an introduction to the study of Ptolemaic astronomy (Stoicheiosis astronomike), and 120 essays on various subjects, the Semeioseis gnomikai. Many of these works are still unedited.

Editions with English translations:

Featherstone, J. M. 2000. Theodore Metochites’s Poems 'To Himself'. Introduction, Text, and Translation. Vienna. 
Reviewed by Lazaris, S. 2002. "Jeffrey Michael Featherstone (Introduction, Text and Translation), Theodore Metochites’s poems 'to Himself' [Byzantina vindobonensia, XXIII], Wien : Verlag der Österreichischen Akademie der Wissenschaften, 2000", Scriptorium 56, p. 328*-330*()

Hult, K. 2002. Theodore Metochites on Ancient Authors and Philosophy: Semeioseis gnomikai 1–26 & 71. A Critical Edition with Introduction, Translation, Notes, and Indexes. With a Contribution by B. Bydén. Studia Graeca et Latina Gothoburgensia 65. Gothenburg. 
Hult, K. 2016. Theodore Metochites on the Human Condition and the Decline of Rome. Semeioseis gnomikai 27–60. A Critical Edition with Introduction, Translation, Notes, and Indexes. Studia Graeca et Latina Gothoburgensia 70. Gothenburg. , 
Wahlgren, S. 2018. Theodore Metochites' Sententious Notes: Semeioseis gnomikai 61–70 & 72–81. A critical edition with introduction, translation, notes, and indexes.Studia Graeca et Latina Gothoburgensia 71. Gothenburg.  
Xenophontos, S. 2020. On Morals or Concerning Education. Dumbarton Oaks Medieval Library 61. Cambridge, MA. 

Editions without translation:

Bydén, B. 2003. Theodore Metochites' Stoicheiosis astronomike and the study of natural philosophy and mathematics in early Palaiologan Byzantium. 2nd rev. ed. Acta Universitatis Gothoburgensis. Studia Graeca et Latina Gothoburgensia 66. Göteborg. 
Polemis, I. D. 2015, Theodorus Metochita. Carmina (Corpus Christianorum. Series Graeca  83), Turnhout: Brepols Publishers, 2015. 
Polemis, I. D. and E. Kaltsogianni. 2019. Orationes. Bibliotheca Scriptorum Graecorum et Romanorum Teubneriana 2031. Berlin.

See also
Gregory Palamas

Footnotes

References 
Beck, H.-G. 1952. Theodoros Metochites: Die Krise des byzantinischen Weltbildes im 14. Jahrhundert. Munich.
Ševčenko, I. 1962. La vie intellectuelle et politique à Byzance sous les premiers Paléologues: Études sur la polémique entre Théodore Métochite et Nicéphore Choumnos. Corpus Bruxellense Historiae Byzantinae. Subsidia 3. Brussels.
Ševčenko, I. 1975. Theodore Metochites, the Chora, and the Intellectual Trends of His Time. In Underwood, P. A., ed., The Kariye Djami, vol. 4, Studies in the Art of the Kariye Djami and Its Intellectual Background, London, 17–91. (See also .)
de Vries-van der Velden, E. 1987. Théodore Métochite: Une réévaluation. Amsterdam. 
Bydén, B. 2003. Theodore Metochites' Stoicheiosis astronomike and the study of natural philosophy and mathematics in early Palaiologan Byzantium. 2nd rev. ed. Acta Universitatis Gothoburgensis. Studia Graeca et Latina Gothoburgensia 66. Göteborg.

External links 
 
 (PDF version)

1270 births
1332 deaths
Byzantine officials
Byzantine philosophers
Commentators on Aristotle
14th-century Byzantine writers
14th-century Byzantine historians
14th-century Eastern Orthodox Christians
Theodore
Byzantine diplomats
14th-century diplomats
14th-century philosophers
Logothetes
13th-century Greek educators
14th-century Greek scientists
14th-century Greek educators
13th-century Greek philosophers
14th-century Greek philosophers
13th-century Greek mathematicians
14th-century Greek mathematicians
13th-century Greek astronomers
14th-century Greek astronomers